Benjamin E. Park is an American historian concentrating on early American political, religious, and intellectual history, history of gender, religious studies, slavery, anti-slavery, and Atlantic history. Park is an assistant professor at Sam Houston State University.

Career
Park is co-editor of Mormon Studies Review (2019– ), a member of the executive committee of the Mormon History Association (2017– ), editor of the Mormon Studies [book] Series for Fairleigh Dickinson University Press (2016– ), a member of the editorial board of the Journal of Mormon History (2012–2015), a founder and editor of The Junto: A Group Blog on Early American History (2012– ), a founder and co-editor of the Patheos.com column Peculiar People (2012–2015), a member of the editorial board of Dialogue: A Journal of Mormon Thought (2011–2012), and a founder and contributing editor at Juvenile Instructor: A Mormon History Blog (2007– ).

A review of Park's American Nationalisms in Journal of the Early Republic said, "Park’s ambition is the source of this book’s strengths and of most of its shortcomings"; and, a review in Journal of American History said that Park "argues that the Revolution severed the one thing Americans had in common, that they were subjects of the British Crown. The lack of definition in American nationhood fostered grave anxieties for the country's future. To fill the gap and unify the citizenry, thinkers in the early republic cultivated particularist visions of American character and destiny and projected them onto the country as a whole. These notions were regionally grounded." The book was a finalist for Johns Hopkins University Press's Sally and Morris Lasky Prize for Political History.

Kingdom of Nauvoo (2020) is described in Publishers Weekly as Park's "fastidiously researched" telling of the Latter Day Saints "'kingdom of Nauvoo' in western Illinois. [...] Park, who was given extensive access to the Mormon Church’s archives, entertainingly establishes this little-known Mormon settlement’s proper place within the formative years of the Illinois and Missouri frontier." According to its Kirkus review, the aspirations of the Latter Day Saints that Park documents in the book "involved a repudiation of the [U.S.] Constitution in favor of a document called the Council of Fifty, which, [according to Park], 'rejected America’s democratic system as a failed experiment and sought to replace it with a theocratic kingdom.'"

During 2014, a book review by Park (viz. of David F. Holland's Sacred Borders: Continuing Revelation and Canonical Restraint in Early America) catalyzed some controversy among the Mormon apologetics community. In his review, Park advocated for the robustly secular framework of 19th-century historical studies within which to engage the greater religious studies academy with regard to Book of Mormon studies.

In 2017, Park joined twenty other Mormon studies scholars in signing a friend-of-the-court brief filed with the U.S. Supreme Court with regard to its review of Trump Administration's travel bans. The brief draws parallels between historical U.S. government-promoted anti-Mormon sentiments and the allegedly anti-Muslim atmosphere of the proposed bans. In 2017 Park was among ten co-authors publishing "Shoulder to the Wheel: Resources to Help Latter-day Saints Face Racism ..."

Education and early life 
Park received his bachelor's degree in both English and history from Brigham Young University in 2009. He then went on to study at the University of Edinburgh. After that he studied at the University of Cambridge, completing a doctorate there in 2014. Before joining the faculty of Sam Houston State (2016), Park lectured at the University of Missouri as the inaugural postdoctoral fellow in history at the Kinder Institute on Constitutional Democracy (2014–2016) and at the University of Cambridge (2012–2014) as a supervisor and lecturer in history.

As a young Latter-day Saint, Park served as a missionary for the Church of Jesus Christ of Latter-day Saints in the Washington, D.C., area.

Publications
 

Park has written reference-book entries, journal articles, book reviews, essays, and op-eds.

References

Sources
Sam Houston State University bio
"By Common Consent" bio

External links
 
 BenjaminPark.com/Online-writing

Multi-media
 (Transcript.)
 

American bloggers
American educators
American Latter Day Saint writers
Brigham Young University alumni
Historians of the United States
Historians of the Latter Day Saint movement
Living people
Mormon bloggers
Mormon studies scholars
Sam Houston State University faculty
Alumni of the University of Edinburgh
Alumni of the University of Cambridge
American expatriates in the United Kingdom
Year of birth missing (living people)
American Mormon missionaries in the United States